On 12 March 1893, one of the first football matches in Catalonia took place at the Hippodrome of Can Tunis, Barcelona. The match was contested by the members of the Barcelona Football Club, who were divided into two teams: one dressed in blue and the other one in red.

The game was won by the Blues 2–1 with goals from the Catalans Figueras and Barrié, while the red's consolation was netted by the Englishmen Mr. Reeves, but most important than the result and its goalscorers, was its historical significance, given that this match was the subject of the first proper chronicle of the dispute of a football match in Spain, which appeared in La Dinastía on 16 March, written by Enrique Font Valencia, who detailed the aspects of the game, including lineups, the color of the clothes, the name of the referee, the result and the goalscorers. Moreover, the photograph of these two sides just before the match is widely regarded as the oldest photo of a football team in Spain. According to the chronicle, the match took place at four in the afternoon, in a field near the Hippodrome of Can Tunis, and it concludes by assuring that this group will keep promoting the sport of football in the years to come.

Background
Football first entered Catalonia thanks to the British colony that worked and lived there, among whom a certain James Reeves stood out. He arrived in Barcelona at some point in 1892, a time when football was a sport practically unknown in the city, but since he was an enthusiastic and passionate lover of the game, he decided to create his own club which would include Britons and Catalans alike. Being the spokesman for the British members of Club Regatas de Barcelona (a club of rowing and sailing), he convinced a number of Britons, Catalan and French members of the Regatas Club to practice football. He did the same with some British cricketers belonging to the Barcelona Cricket Club of Ronda de Sant Pere. This group of football pioneers, simply known as Barcelona Football Club, organized and played the first known football match in the city on 25 December 1892 in Can Tunis in a field located between the hippodrome and the Civil Arsenal, however, very little is known about that Christmas Day. Reeves kept organizing football games among the members of the British Club, and three months later, on 12 March 1893, the Blues faced the Reds again in the last game of the season (at the time, football was an autumn-winter sport).

Photograph

Years after the game, specifically on 6 January 1906, Joaquim Escardó of Los Deportes published a report about the football of the 1890s and especially on this match played on 12 March 1893. In the article, there is a picture of the 22 footballers that played that match, plus the referee (dressed in black) and a young boy who watched from the stands (Sat on the floor). Escardó did not date it exactly (“The two sides of the then-existing Barcelona Football Club formed around the years from 1892 to 1895…”), but the coincidence of the players and referee suggests that this engraving corresponds to the match played on 12 March, thus being the first image of a football team from Spain. Agustí Rodes i Catalá has dated this photograph to even earlier, to 1892, but with that said he also identifies it as the team of a Methodist church in Barcelona, which is also not true, since most of them are Catholic.

The caption names all the figures and goes as follows: Daunt, S. Morris (Samuel), Barrié, Collet, Wood, Morris senior (Enrique), Richardson, Brown, MacAndrews, Park, Serra, Tuñí, Figueras, Dumsday, Cochran (Cockram), Reewes (Reeves), P. Noble, Chofre, Dagnière, Lockie, Higgins, Beaty-Pownall, J. Morris (Junior) and Bell. The boy is a 13-year-old, Miguel Morris (Junior), the younger brother of Samuel (standing, second from the left) and Enrique (wearing a beret). The four figures who are standing in the first row are most likely the youngest of the group, with a 13-year-old Morris, an 18-year-old Beaty-Pownall, and two other young-looking players, Bell and Higgins. The captains of each team, James Reeves and George Cockram, can be seen in the second row alongside each other. Coincidentally, both of their names appear misspelled (Reewes and Cochran). In addition to the Morris brothers and the captains, other notable figures in the photo include MacAndrews and Wood, two of the founders of the Barcelona Cricket Club. Some of the first Catalans known to play football can also been seen such as Alberto Serra, Tuñí, Chofre, Barrié, and Figueras (members of Club Regatas).

Overview

Since the figure of a coach as we know it today did not yet exist, it was James Reeves who, as the undisputed leader of the club, was in charge of making up the line-ups and dictating the tactics to be followed. The way and how the line-ups were chosen remains unknown, because the Frenchmen (Barrié, Daunt and Dagniere) and the Morris brothers are on opposite teams, with Enrique playing for the Blues as a forward while Samuel represented the Reds as a goalkeeper, and the latter managed to keep his brother at bay despite losing the game.

Admission was free and there were plenty of curious friends of the town's football players. The blue team was captained by George Cockram and the red one was led by Mr. Reeves, who captained by example, netting his side's only goal in a 1–2 loss. Notably, both Blue goals were scored by non-Britions, Figueras and Barrié, meaning that Reeves's inclusion of foreigners was paying off, as they showed they could play football just as well as its inventors.

Final details

|valign="top" width="50%"|

|}

Aftermath
This group of football pioneers in the city kept organizing football matches and promoting the sport, and in late 1894, they move to the Velódromo de la Bonanova, as they were looking for a place of easier access to the city center, and from then on, Sunday football games became a regular event at Bonanova, and although its vast majority were training matches (Blues vs Reds), they also began to play against teams from other cities, such as Torelló, which at that time constituted a novelty, and as a result, football in Catalonia kept growing.

See also
Football in Catalonia

References

Sport in Barcelona
1890s in Spanish sport
1894 in association football
1893 in European football
March 1893 sports events
19th century in Spain